24K may refer to:

 24 karats, as in 24-karat gold
 24K, an unreleased album by Cuban Link
 24k, a 1983 album by Band of Joy
 24K, a 2016 album by Evelina
 24K (band), a Korean K-pop boy band